Takashi Hirose may refer to the following:

Taka Hirose (born 1967), Japanese musician and chef who is the bass guitarist for the rock band Feeder
Takashi Hirose (swimmer) (died 2002), American swimmer
Takashi Hirose (writer) (born 1943), Japanese writer